Adam Hamidovich Saitiev, also spelled Saytiev, (born December 12, 1977) is a Russian wrestler of Chechen descent who won gold at the 2000 Summer Olympics for the Russian Federation at 85 kg cat. Adam also won the Wrestling World Championships in 1999 and 2002.

His elder brother Buvaisar Saitiev, also a wrestler, won gold in the 1996 Summer Olympics in Atlanta, in the 2004 Summer Olympics in Athens and again in the 2008 Summer Olympics.

Wrestling career

Adam initially started his senior-level international career at 69 kg, or around 152 lbs. He found the weight cut too severe, and soon moved up to 76 kg, where he was world champ in 1999. However, this was his elder brother Buvaisar's weight, and Adam wanted to compete alongside his brother at the Olympics, not compete with him for a spot on the team. Adam moved up to 85 kg, and despite being undersized, won two world-level titles at the weight.

Saitiev competed many times throughout after 2002. But his career had many injuries.

Saitiev made a comeback in 2012. He found significant success, but in the Russian freestyle wrestling championships 2012 final match lost to Denis Tsargush (1-0; 1-0)

Adam is a recipient of the Order of Honor (2001) and Order of Friendship (2004).

Match results
{| class="wikitable collapsible"
! colspan="7"| World Championships & Olympic Games Matches
|-
!  Res.
!  Record
!  Opponent
!  Score
!  Date
!  Event
!  Location
|-
! style=background:white colspan=7 |
|-
|Win
|21-3
|align=left| Yoel Romero
|style="font-size:88%"|4-3
|style="font-size:88%" rowspan=5|September 5, 2002
|style="font-size:88%" rowspan=5|2002 World Wrestling Championships
|style="text-align:left;font-size:88%;" rowspan=5| Tehran, Iran
|-
|Win
|20-3
|align=left| Arkadii Tzopa
|style="font-size:88%"|Fall
|-
|Win
|19-3
|align=left| Marcin Jurecki
|style="font-size:88%"|7-3
|-
|Win
|18-3
|align=left| Aman Deep
|style="font-size:88%"|Tech. Fall
|-
|Win
|17-3
|align=left| Narantsetseg Burenbaatar
|style="font-size:88%"|Tech. Fall
|-
! style=background:white colspan=7 |
|-
|Win
|16-3
|align=left| Yoel Romero
|style="font-size:88%"|Fall
|style="font-size:88%" rowspan=5|September 28, 2000
|style="font-size:88%" rowspan=5|2000 Summer Olympics
|style="text-align:left;font-size:88%;" rowspan=5| Sydney, Australia
|-
|Win
|15-3
|align=left| Magomed Ibragimov
|style="font-size:88%"|3-0
|-
|Win
|14-3
|align=left| Yang Hyung-mo
|style="font-size:88%"|5-0
|-
|Win
|13-3
|align=left| Igor Praporshchikov
|style="font-size:88%"|Fall
|-
|Win
|12-3
|align=left| Beibulat Musaev
|style="font-size:88%"|4-1
|-
! style=background:white colspan=7 |
|-
|Win
|11-3
|align=left| Alexander Leipold
|style="font-size:88%"|6-3
|style="font-size:88%" rowspan=6|October 7, 1999
|style="font-size:88%" rowspan=6|1999 World Wrestling Championships
|style="text-align:left;font-size:88%;" rowspan=6| Ankara, Turkey
|-
|Win
|10-3
|align=left| Joe Williams
|style="font-size:88%"|Fall
|-
|Win
|9-3
|align=left| Alik Musaev
|style="font-size:88%"|4-0
|-
|Win
|8-3
|align=left| Arpad Ritter
|style="font-size:88%"|11-3
|-
|Win
|7-3
|align=left| Radoslaw Horbik
|style="font-size:88%"|9-0
|-
|Win
|6-3
|align=left| Ruslan Khinchagov
|style="font-size:88%"|7-1
|-
! style=background:white colspan=7 |
|-
|Loss
|5-3
|align=left| Davoud Ghanbari
|style="font-size:88%"|Inj. Def.
|style="font-size:88%" rowspan=8|August 29, 1997
|style="font-size:88%" rowspan=8|1997 World Wrestling Championships
|style="text-align:left;font-size:88%;" rowspan=8| Krasnojarsk, Russia
|-
|Loss
|5-2
|align=left| Zaza Zazirov
|style="font-size:88%"|2-4
|-
|Win
|5-1
|align=left| Yüksel Şanlı
|style="font-size:88%"|Fall
|-
|Win
|4-1
|align=left| Almazbek Askarov
|style="font-size:88%"|Fall
|-
|Win
|3-1
|align=left| David Gagishvili
|style="font-size:88%"|Fall
|-
|Win
|2-1
|align=left| Elchad Allakhverdiev
|style="font-size:88%"|4-2
|-
|Loss
|1-1
|align=left| Igor Kupeev
|style="font-size:88%"|2-5
|-
|Win
|1-0
|align=left| Juan Carlos Rivero
|style="font-size:88%"|Tech. Fall
|-

References

1977 births
Chechen martial artists
Living people
Olympic gold medalists for Russia
Olympic wrestlers of Russia
Wrestlers at the 2000 Summer Olympics
Russian male sport wrestlers
People from Khasavyurt
Olympic medalists in wrestling
Russian people of Chechen descent
Chechen sportsmen
World Wrestling Championships medalists
Medalists at the 2000 Summer Olympics
European Wrestling Championships medalists
Sportspeople from Dagestan
20th-century Russian people
21st-century Russian people